Renzo Jair Tjon-A-Joe is a Surinamese swimmer who mainly swims in 50 m and 100 m freestyle events. He competed at the 2016 and 2020 Summer Olympics, Renzo is the fastest swimmer in Surinamese history in the 50 m and 100 m freestyle category.

Biography 
Suriname-born Renzo Tjon-A-Joe is his country's fastest swimmer to date. He made his first appearance on the world stage at the age of 18, as a member of the Surinamese selection for the 2013 Junior Worlds in Dubai, UAE. In Dubai, he was a finalist in the 50 m freestyle. He went on to be the most successful athlete from Suriname in 2013 and 2015 and was named 2013 and 2015 Male Athlete of the Year. In his country, he currently holds all national sprint records for the 50 m and 100 m freestyle in the long course and short course. Renzo previously trained at Auburn University in preparation for the 2016 Summer Olympics under the sprint coach Brett Hawke. He studied Economics at the Harvard Extension School for two years before dropping out and further pursuing his swim career. In 2018 Tjon A Joe completed a regional sprint trifecta- winning gold in the 50m Freestyle at the ODESUR South American Games, Central American and Caribbean Games and CCCAN Championships.

Personal bests 
 Mexico, Veracruz, 2014 Central American& Caribbean Games, 50 m butterfly bronze medal,
 50 m freestyle silver medal, 100 m freestyle 4th place, all national records
 Chile, 2014 Junior South American Championships, 50 m freestyle finalist, silver medal
 Dubai, 2013 Junior World Championship, 50 m freestyle finalist
 Dubai, 2013 Junior World Championship, 100 m freestyle, semi-finalist
 Jamaica, 2013, 50 m freestyle finalist, gold medal/new meet record
 Chile, 2013, South American Junior Championships 50 m freestyle finalist, silver medal
USA, 2015 Arena Pro Swim Series Mesa, Arizona 50 m freestyle finalist with 22.53
Cochabamba, 2018 South American Gold Medalist, 50 m freestyle

Achievements 
 First Surinamer to swim under 50 seconds in 100 m freestyle ( SC-2014) and under 23 seconds in 50 m freestyle (LC-2013)
 Male Swimmer of the Year Suriname 2013
 Male Athlete of the Year Suriname 2013
 He broke a national record in 50 m freestyle at the 2013 Junior Worlds in Dubai (22.75)
 A-finalist in the 50 m freestyle at the Arena Grand Prix, Orlando, Florida (02/14)
 A-finalist in the 50 m freestyle at the Arena Grand Prix, Meza, Arizona (06/14)
 Sep. 1, 2014 – training with the Auburn Pro Team at Auburn University.
 MBTA Man of the Year 2005
 Auburn University Swimming and Diving Coach: Brett Hawke
 Male Swimmer of the Year Suriname 2014
 Nominated in top 3 athletes of Suriname for Athlete of the Year 2014 Award
 Male Athlete of the Year Suriname 2015

National records 

 with Juan Limburg, Irvin Hoost, and Zuhayr Pigot

International competitions

2014 Arena Grand Prix Series USA 

 02/2014: Orlando, Florida: 50 freestyle: A-Finalist, 8th : 22.98
 02/2014: Orlando, FL: 100 freestyle: C-Finalist, 24th: 52.79
 04/2014: Mesa, AZ: 50 freestyle: A-Finalist, 7th place 22.91
 04/2014: Mesa, AZ: 100 freestyle: B-Finalist, 14th place 51.27

2015 Arena Grand Prix Series USA 

 02/2015: Orlando, FL: 50 freestyle: B-Final, 2nd: 23.07 (10th overall)
 02/2015: Orlando, FL: 100 freestyle: C-Final, 1st: 50.91 (8th overall)

Speedo Championship Series, USA 

 03/15: Plantation, FL: 50 freestyle: A-Final, 2nd: 23.14
 03/15: Plantation, FL: 100 freestyle: A-Final, 3rd : 50.44

Personal life 
Tjon-A-Joe has an older brother named Maikel and a younger sister named Arantxa. He speaks Dutch, English, Sranan Tongo. He has said his favourite film is Pim De La Parra's, Wan Pipel.

References 

 Auburn University http://www.auburntigers.com/sports/c-swim/coach_hawke.html
 Suriname's swimming federation: Surinaamse Zwem Bond (SZB)
 Suriname Olympic Committee (SOC) http://surolympic.org/
 USA Swimming - Arena Pro Swim Series http://www.usaswimming.org/DesktopDefault.aspx?TabId=1420

External links

1995 births
Surinamese male swimmers
Living people
Sportspeople from Paramaribo
Swimmers at the 2015 Pan American Games
Pan American Games competitors for Suriname
Swimmers at the 2016 Summer Olympics
Olympic swimmers of Suriname
Competitors at the 2014 Central American and Caribbean Games
Competitors at the 2018 Central American and Caribbean Games
Central American and Caribbean Games gold medalists for Suriname
Central American and Caribbean Games silver medalists for Suriname
Central American and Caribbean Games bronze medalists for Suriname
South American Games gold medalists for Suriname
South American Games bronze medalists for Suriname
South American Games medalists in swimming
Competitors at the 2014 South American Games
Competitors at the 2018 South American Games
Swimmers at the 2019 Pan American Games
Central American and Caribbean Games medalists in swimming
Swimmers at the 2020 Summer Olympics
Auburn Tigers men's swimmers